The 2022 SEC Gymnastics Championship was held on March 19, 2022 at the neutral site of Legacy Arena in Birmingham, Alabama. All eight teams competed, with Florida posting a score of 198.200 to win the meet.

Team results 
The top four nationally seeded teams were placed into the night session (II), and the bottom four seeded teams were placed into the day session (I). Florida won the 2022 regular season championship, and then the SEC Championship outright after their second place finish at the 2021 championship.

Final results

Individual results

Medalists

All-Around

References

Gymnastics in the United States
2022 in artistic gymnastics